A national park authority is a special term used in Great Britain for legal bodies charged with maintaining a national park of which, as of October 2021, there are ten in England, three in Wales and two in Scotland. The powers and duties of all such authorities are similar, but their work varies depending on where they are situated.

National park authorities were set up by the Environment Act 1995.


List of national park authorities

England
Peak District National Park Authority
Lake District National Park Authority
Dartmoor National Park Authority
North York Moors National Park Authority
Yorkshire Dales National Park Authority
Exmoor National Park Authority
Northumberland National Park Authority
Broads Authority
New Forest National Park Authority
South Downs National Park Authority

Wales

Snowdonia National Park Authority
Pembrokeshire Coast National Park Authority
Brecon Beacons National Park Authority

Scotland
Loch Lomond and The Trossachs National Park Authority
Cairngorms National Park Authority

See also
National parks of the United Kingdom
National parks of Scotland
Association of National Park Authorities

References

National parks of the United Kingdom
National park administrators